Soita is a genus of tephritid  or fruit flies in the family Tephritidae. Phantasmiella is considered to be a synonym of Soita.

References

Trypetinae